Ivar is a Malayalam action crime thriller film directed by T. K. Rajeev Kumar, loosely based on the Hong Kong crime thriller Infernal Affairs . Jayaram plays the protagonist and Biju Menon is the antagonist. The film also stars Bhavana, Siddique, Janardhanan and Riza Bawa. The film was mostly shot in Steadicam.

Cast
 Jayaram as Ragahva Menon IPS, City Police Commissioner
 Biju Menon as Paampu Jose
 Bhavana as Nandini
 Devi Ajith as Reetha
 Anil Murali as Hakkim, Jose's right hand
 Vinayakan as Vinayakan
 Siddique as Jacob Mathew IPS, Superintendent of Police
 Janardhanan as S.K.Nair IPS, Director General of Police
 Rizabawa as Prem Kumar IPS, Police Commissioner
 Anoop Menon  as Thomas IPS, Assistant Superintendent of Police
 Sona Nair as Mrs. Hakkim
 P. Balachandran as Minnal Thankachan
 Rajesh Hebbar as "Alambu" Rajan, Thankachan's henchmen
 Poornima Anand as Jose's wife
 Lishoy as Circle Inspector
 Kalasala Babu
 J.Pallassery as Chief Minister
 Ramu as Home Minister

References

External links

 

2003 films
2000s Malayalam-language films
Films scored by Srinivas
Films directed by T. K. Rajeev Kumar